Sverre Geir Istad (born 3 January 1965) is a former Norwegian biathlete. He was born in Voss as the son of Jon Istad, and represented the club Voss IL. He competed at the 1988 Winter Olympics in Calgary.

He won a silver medal in the team event at the Biathlon World Championships 1991.

References

External links
 

1965 births
Living people
People from Voss
Norwegian male biathletes
Olympic biathletes of Norway
Biathletes at the 1988 Winter Olympics
Biathlon World Championships medalists
Sportspeople from Vestland
20th-century Norwegian people